Stevan Stefanović (Serbian Cyrillic: Стеван Стефановић; born 28 March 1984) is a former footballer. 

Today he is a coach. He started his coaching career in 2017.

2017- 2018 FK Car konstantin  U-16                      2019- 2020 FK Radnicki Nis U-14                          2020-2021 FK Radnicki Nis U-19    

2021-2022 OFK Radnicki Nis U-14                            

2022-2023 OFK Sindjelic Nis - SENIORS

Notes

1984 births
Living people
Sportspeople from Niš
Serbian footballers
FK Radnički Niš players
Association football midfielders